Douglas Jonathan Hamilton Jr. (born June 17, 1993) is a Canadian professional ice hockey defenceman for the New Jersey Devils of the National Hockey League (NHL). He previously played in the NHL for the Boston Bruins, Calgary Flames, and Carolina Hurricanes. The Bruins selected him in the first round, ninth overall, of the 2011 NHL Entry Draft.

Early life
Hamilton was born on June 17, 1993, in Toronto, Ontario. Both of his parents participated in the 1984 Olympic Games in Los Angeles: his father Doug was a rower in the men's quadruple sculls, while his mother Lynn was a point guard for the Canadian women's basketball team. As a result, Hamilton and his older brother Freddie were exposed to many different sports in their childhoods, from which both developed a passion for ice hockey. He spent three years at Crestwood Preparatory College, after which the Hamiltons moved from Toronto to St. Catharines and he transferred to Governor Simcoe Secondary School. Hamilton played minor ice hockey for the St. Catharines Falcons of the Ontario Minor Hockey Association, where he scored 20 goals and 53 points during the 2008-09 season.

Playing career

Amateur
He was selected by his hometown Niagara IceDogs of the Ontario Hockey League (OHL) in the second round, 27th overall, of the 2009 OHL Priority Selection.

Hamilton played for the Icedogs for three-and-a-half seasons. During his time, he was teammates with future NHL players such as Ryan Strome, Andrew Shaw and Brett Ritchie. Hamilton was also teammates with his older brother Freddie, who was a fifth-round selection of the San Jose Sharks in the 2010 NHL Entry Draft.

Hamilton was ranked fourth by the NHL Central Scouting Bureau for North American skaters for the 2011 NHL Entry Draft. Hamilton was drafted ninth overall by the Boston Bruins.

On December 8, 2011, Hamilton signed a three-year, entry-level contract with the Bruins.

Professional

Boston Bruins
Hamilton began the 2012–13 season with the IceDogs. However, he was recalled by the Bruins to play for the club during the NHL's lockout-shortened season. On January 19, 2013, Hamilton made his NHL debut for the Bruins in a 3–1 victory against the New York Rangers,
 and two games later, on January 23, Hamilton scored his first NHL point for an assist in an overtime loss against the Rangers in Madison Square Garden. On February 15, Hamilton scored his first career NHL goal against Ryan Miller of the Buffalo Sabres. Hamilton made his Stanley Cup playoff debut on May 3, replacing defenceman Andrew Ference, who was serving a one-game suspension for his illegal hit on Toronto Maple Leafs forward Mikhail Grabovski. On April 25, Hamilton was named the 44th Annual NESN 7th Player recipient, an award given to the Bruin who most exceeded all expectations that season, as voted by the team's fans.

Calgary Flames
On June 26, 2015, during the 2015 NHL Entry Draft, as an impending restricted free agent on July 1 and with the Bruins facing salary cap constraints, Hamilton was traded to the Calgary Flames in exchange for a first-round draft pick (used to select Zachary Senyshyn) and two second-round picks (used to select Jakob Forsbacka Karlsson and Jérémy Lauzon), all in the 2015 Draft. Four days later, on June 30, Hamilton signed a six-year, $34.5 million contract with the Flames worth $5.75 million annually.

During the 2016–17 season, Hamilton was paired with Mark Giordano, prompting greater defensive play in both players. The pairing helped the Flames make the playoffs for the second time in three years. The playoffs were short-lived for the Flames, who lost to the Anaheim Ducks in four games. On February 17, 2018, Hamilton played in his 400th NHL game during which he recorded his first NHL hat-trick.

Carolina Hurricanes
On June 23, 2018, Hamilton was traded to the Carolina Hurricanes (along with teammate Micheal Ferland and prospect Adam Fox) in exchange for Elias Lindholm and Noah Hanifin. After a respectable first season with Carolina, Hamilton began the 2019–20 season playing some of the best hockey of his career before his regular season was cut short when he broke his fibula on January 16, 2020. He finished the regular season scoring 40 points in 47 games played. As a result of the COVID-19 pandemic, the NHL season was paused, and delayed for several months allowing Hamilton to return for Carolina's final five games of the 2020 Stanley Cup playoffs. Despite missing several months of games due to his injury, Hamilton finished seventh in James Norris Memorial Trophy voting. Coming back from injury while playing on an expiring contract, Hamilton had another stellar year, finishing the 2020–21 season fourth in Norris Trophy voting.

New Jersey Devils
After three productive seasons with the Hurricanes, Hamilton left the club as a free agent and on July 28, 2021, he was signed to a seven-year, $63 million contract with the New Jersey Devils.

International play

Hamilton participated at the 2012 World Junior Ice Hockey Championships held in Canada and won the bronze medal. Hamilton played for the team the following tournament, where Canada finished fourth.

Personal life
After retiring from professional athletics, Hamilton's father became a lawyer and an athletic executive, serving as chair of the 2022 Canada Summer Games. His older brother Freddie was drafted by the San Jose Sharks in 2010 and played for the Colorado Avalanche, Calgary Flames, and Arizona Coyotes. After his release from the Coyotes in 2018, Freddie retired from hockey and returned to school to pursue his Master of Business Administration from Yale University.

Career statistics

Regular season and playoffs

International

Awards and honours

References

External links
 

1993 births
Living people
Boston Bruins draft picks
Boston Bruins players
Calgary Flames players
Carolina Hurricanes players
Canadian ice hockey defencemen
National Hockey League first-round draft picks
New Jersey Devils players
Niagara IceDogs players
Ice hockey people from Toronto